The Predator, published in 1996 and written by K. A. Applegate, is the fifth book in the Animorphs series. It is narrated by Marco.

Plot summary
Two years before the events of the novel, Marco's mother vanished in a boating accident; her body was never found. Marco's father has fallen into deep depression and Marco is having second thoughts about fighting the Yeerks, parasitic aliens that are the main antagonists of the series, as he does not want his father to lose him too.

Ax wishes to return to the Andalite home world, and to do so, he needs a ship. He intends to build a communicator to broadcast a Yeerk distress signal and lure in a Yeerk ship which he can then hijack. He, Jake, and Marco go to the mall to buy the equipment to build a communicator. Ax finds the food court and runs wild sampling food left over on tables, overwhelmed by the new sense of taste. He is chased by security guards and, frightened, demorphs in the middle of the mall in front of many people. Ax, Jake, and Marco run out of the mall and into a nearby grocery store where they are chased by Controllers. They morph into lobsters and hide in a tank. They later narrowly escape being boiled alive.

Ax builds his device, but needs a zero-space transponder. Vice principal Hedrick Chapman regularly communicates with Visser Three from his basement, so the Animorphs morph into ants and retrieve the Z-space transponder that he uses. As they are returning from Chapman's house, they are almost killed when attacked by ants from another colony. They are able to demorph in time, but everyone is upset by the experience.

Ax completes his device, and broadcasts the signal, but the Yeerks have changed their distress frequencies, and, sensing a trap, they set one of their own. The Animorphs are captured (in animal morph) and taken aboard the Yeerk mother ship in Earth orbit, where Visser One is visiting. Visser One confronts them and her host body is revealed to be Marco's mother, who is alive after all. The Animorphs are put in a cell, but they are freed by one of Visser One's Hork-Bajir; Visser One and Visser Three are rivals, and Visser One wanted to disgrace Visser Three. The Animorphs reach an escape pod and return to Earth.
   
Marco asks Jake, the only one who had previously met Marco's mom, not to tell any of the others about Visser One. Marco resolves to continue fighting the Yeerks, as he now has a personal motivation to free his mother.

Morphs

TV adaptation
The Predator was adapted as part of the Animorphs TV series, which aired on Nickelodeon and YTV between the fall of 1998 and the spring of 2000. The fifth book was covered by the fourteenth and fifteenth episodes, "The Leader" (Parts 1 and 2), along with plot lines from The Stranger. The TV episodes did not follow the books faithfully, altering many aspects of the characters' roles within the Animorphs, the events in the war against the Yeerks, and added plot lines that were not present in the books.

Only Marco and Jake are taken aboard the Yeerk Pool Ship, captured while attempting to infiltrate the EGS tower and destroy the Kandrona, leaving Cassie and Rachel behind to complete the task; in the book, Visser Three captures all of the morphed Animorphs, and presents them to Visser One, who subsequently releases them. The destruction of the Kandrona occurs in The Stranger.
Visser Three would not be in human morph while on the Pool Ship; it is clear from the books that the Visser greatly prefers his Andalite host body to "weak" and "puny" human bodies.
In the book, Visser One's personal guard leads the Animorphs to an escape pod that returns them to Earth; in the TV episode, Marco and Jake commandeer a Blade Ship in order to escape the Pool Ship, which is not of the "jellyfish" design frequently described in the books.

Re-release
Scholastic re-released The Predator with a new lenticular cover in December 2011.

References

External links
Official page at Scholastic.com

Animorphs books
1996 science fiction novels
1996 novels